The Phlaeothripinae are a subfamily of thrips, with hundreds of genera.

The Clidemia thrips Liothrips urichi, and the alligator weed thrips Amynothrips andersoni belong to this subfamily.

Genera

This list of genera in the subfamily Phlaeothripinae is complete according to the Thrips of the World Checklist (January 4, 2007).

 Ablemothrips 
 Acaciothrips 
 Acanthothrips 
 Aclystothrips 
 Acrosothrips 
 Adamantothrips 
 Adelphothrips 
 Adraneothrips 
 Adrothrips 
 Adurothrips 
 Advenathrips 
 Aeglothrips 
 Aesthetothrips 
 Afrothrips 
 Agnostochthona 
 Agrothrips 
 Agynaikothrips 
 Aiganothrips 
 Akainothrips 
 Akthethrips 
 Alerothrips 
 Aleurodothrips 
 Alloiothrips 
 Alocothrips 
 Amothrips 
 Amphibolothrips 
 Amynothrips 
 Ananthakrishnana 
 Ananthakrishnanothrips 
 Andrethrips 
 Androthrips 
 Apelaunothrips 
 Apostlethrips 
 Apterygothrips 
 Araeothrips 
 Arrhenothrips 
 Asemothrips 
 Asianthrips 
 Ataliothrips 
 Athlibothrips 
 Aulothrips 
 Austrothrips 
 Ayyarothrips 
 Azaleothrips 
 Baenothrips 
 Bagnalliella 
 Bamboosiella 
 Bebelothrips 
 Biconothrips 
 Blepharidothrips 
 Boothrips 
 Brachythrips 
 Bradythrips 
 Brakothrips 
 Bunothrips 
 Byctothrips 
 Calamothrips 
 Callithrips 
 Carathrips 
 Carcinothrips 
 Carissothrips 
 Carius 
 Cartomothrips 
 Cecidothrips 
 Cephalothrips 
 Cephenothrips 
 Chaetokarnyia 
 Chalepothrips 
 Chamaeothrips 
 Chelaeothrips 
 Chiraplothrips 
 Chiridothrips 
 Chiridurothrips 
 Chirothripoides 
 Chlarathrips 
 Choleothrips 
 Chorithrips 
 Chortothrips 
 Chromatothrips 
 Chthonothrips 
 Claustrothrips 
 Conocephalothrips 
 Corroboreethrips 
 Corycidothrips 
 Coryphothrips 
 Coxothrips 
 Craniothrips 
 Crespithrips 
 Crinitothrips 
 Crotonothrips 
 Csirothrips 
 Dactylothrips 
 Deplorothrips 
 Dexiothrips 
 Dimorphothrips 
 Diphyothrips 
 Dixothrips 
 Docessissophothrips 
 Dolicholepta 
 Dolichothrips 
 Domatiathrips 
 Domeothrips 
 Dopothrips 
 Dunatothrips 
 Dyothrips 
 Dyscolothrips 
 Ecacanthothrips 
 Eothrips 
 Eparsothrips 
 Epomisothrips 
 Eschatothrips 
 Eugynothrips 
 Eumorphothrips 
 Euoplothrips 
 Eupathithrips 
 Eurhynchothrips 
 Euryaplothrips 
 Eurynothrips 
 Eurythrips 
 Eurytrichothrips 
 Gabonothrips 
 Gemmathrips 
 Gigantothrips 
 Glaridothrips 
 Glenothrips 
 Glubothrips 
 Gluphothrips 
 Glyptothrips 
 Gnophothrips 
 Godoythrips 
 Gomphiothrips 
 Goniothrips 
 Grypothrips 
 Gymnothrips 
 Gynaikothrips 
 Habrothrips 
 Hadothrips 
 Halothrips 
 Hansonthrips 
 Hapedothrips 
 Hapelothrips 
 Haplothrips 
 Hapsidothrips 
 Heligmothrips 
 Heliothripoides 
 Heptadikothrips 
 Hexadikothrips 
 Hindsiothrips 
 Holcothrips 
 Holopothrips 
 Holothrips 
 Hoodiana 
 Hoplandrothrips 
 Hoplothrips 
 Horistothrips 
 Hyidiothrips 
 Idiothrips 
 Iniothrips 
 Iotatubothrips 
 Isotrichothrips 
 Jacobothrips 
 Jacotia 
 Jennythrips 
 Karnyothrips 
 Katothrips 
 Kellyia 
 Kladothrips 
 Kochummania 
 Koptothrips 
 Kolia
 Leeuwenia 
 Leptoliothrips 
 Leptothrips 
 Lichanothrips 
 Liophlaeothrips 
 Liothrips 
 Liotrichothrips 
 Lispothrips 
 Lissothrips 
 Litotetothrips 
 Lizalothrips 
 Logadothrips 
 Lonchothrips 
 Lygothrips 
 Macrophthalmothrips 
 Majerthrips 
 Malacothrips 
 Mallothrips 
 Manothrips 
 Margaritothrips 
 Mastigothrips 
 Mathetithrips 
 Matilethrips 
 Maurithrips 
 Maxillata 
 Maxillithrips 
 Medogothrips 
 Megeugynothrips 
 Membrothrips 
 Menothrips 
 Mesicothrips 
 Mesothrips 
 Metriothrips 
 Microdontothrips 
 Mimothrips 
 Mixothrips 
 Moultonides 
 Murphythrips 
 Mutothrips 
 Mychiothrips 
 Myopothrips 
 Mystrothrips 
 Necrothrips 
 Neocecidothrips 
 Neodixothrips 
 Neohoodiella 
 Neothrips 
 Neurothrips 
 Ocnothrips 
 Octurothrips 
 Ocythrips 
 Oidanothrips 
 Okajimathrips 
 Opidnothrips 
 Orthothrips 
 Ostlingothrips 
 Pachyliothrips 
 Panceratothrips 
 Panoplothrips 
 Parabaphothrips 
 Paracholeothrips 
 Paramystrothrips 
 Pedoeothrips 
 Pegothrips 
 Pentagonothrips 
 Phallothrips 
 Phasmothrips 
 Phenicothrips 
 Phenothrips 
 Phiarothrips 
 Philothrips 
 Phlaeothrips 
 Phorinothrips 
 Phylladothrips 
 Pistillothrips 
 Plagiothrips 
 Plectrothrips 
 Pleurothrips 
 Plicothrips 
 Pnigmothrips 
 Podothrips 
 Poecilothrips 
 Polygonothrips 
 Pongola 
 Ponticulothrips 
 Porcothrips 
 Praeciputhrips 
 Praepodothrips 
 Preeriella 
 Priesneria 
 Priesnerothrips 
 Pristothrips 
 Prohaplothrips 
 Proleeuwenia 
 Propealiothrips 
 Propesolomonthrips 
 Prosantothrips 
 Protolispothrips 
 Psalidothrips 
 Pselaphothrips 
 Psenothrips 
 Psephenothrips 
 Pseudophilothrips 
 Pueblothrips 
 Pygmaeothrips 
 Pyknothrips 
 Ramakrishnaiella 
 Retiothrips 
 Rhaptothrips 
 Rhinoceps 
 Rhopalothripoides 
 Rosingothrips 
 Sacothrips 
 Sagenothrips 
 Sakimurella 
 Salothrips 
 Sartrithrips 
 Sauridothrips 
 Scelothrips 
 Schazothrips 
 Schedothrips 
 Schlechtendalia 
 Schwarzithrips 
 Scopaeothrips 
 Sedulothrips 
 Senarioliothrips 
 Senegathrips 
 Senithrips 
 Sinuothrips 
 Smicrothrips 
 Socothrips 
 Solomonthrips 
 Sophikothrips 
 Sophiothrips 
 Sphingothrips 
 Spilothrips 
 Stannardiana 
 Stannardothrips 
 Stegothrips 
 Stenocephalothrips 
 Stephanothrips 
 Stictothrips 
 Stomothrips 
 Strassenia 
 Strepterothrips 
 Streptothrips 
 Sucinothrips 
 Sumatrothrips 
 Sunaitothrips 
 Suocerathrips 
 Symphyothrips 
 Synergothrips 
 Syringothrips 
 Talitha 
 Tamilthrips 
 Temenothrips 
 Terthrothrips 
 Tetracanthothrips 
 Tetradothrips 
 Tetragonothrips 
 Teuchothrips 
 Thaumatothrips 
 Thilakothrips 
 Thlibothrips 
 Thorybothrips 
 Tolmetothrips 
 Torvothrips 
 Trachythrips 
 Tragothrips 
 Treherniella 
 Triadothrips 
 Trichinothrips 
 Tropothrips 
 Truncatothrips 
 Trybomia 
 Trypanothrips 
 Tumidothrips 
 Turmathrips 
 Tylothrips 
 Urothrips 
 Veerabahuthrips 
 Vicinothrips 
 Vuilletia 
 Walkerthrips 
 Warithrips 
 Williamsiella 
 Xaniothrips 
 Xeroleptothrips 
 Xiphidothrips 
 Xyelethrips 
 Xylaplothrips 
 Xyloplothrips 
 Yarnkothrips 
 Zaliothrips 
 Zelotothrips 
 Zemiathrips 
 Zuluiella

References 

Phlaeothripidae
Insect subfamilies